Anika Noni Rose (born September 6, 1972) is an American actress and singer. She is best known for voicing Tiana, Disney's first African-American princess, as seen in The Princess and the Frog (2009). She was named a Disney Legend in 2011.

She is also known for her starring role as Lorrell Robinson in the Academy Award-winning film Dreamgirls (2006) and for playing LaVerne "Jukebox" Ganner in the Starz series Power. She is also known for her performances in theatre, particularly for her starring roles as Emmie Thibodeaux in the Broadway production of Caroline, or Change (2004), for which she won the Tony Award for Best Featured Actress in a Musical, and Beneatha Younger in the Broadway revival of A Raisin in the Sun (2014), for which she was nominated for the Tony Award for Best Featured Actress in a Play.

Early life
Rose was born in Bloomfield, Connecticut, to Claudia and John Rose, a corporate counsel. She began her acting career in Bloomfield high school, appearing in a school production during her freshman year. She earned a Bachelor's Degree in theatre from Florida A&M University, then studied drama at the American Conservatory Theater in San Francisco.

Career

Early career
Rose moved to New York without a job. After three months, she played the role of Rusty in Broadway's Footloose. She followed Footloose with numerous workshops and two musicals using pre-existing song catalogs, Eli's Comin''' Off-Broadway and Me and Mrs. Jones with Lou Rawls in Philadelphia. Both of the full-scale tuners were rumored for transfers, but neither made it anywhere after their limited engagements ended. Rose's big Broadway break was getting cast as Emmie Thibodeaux in Caroline, or Change. In 2004, she was awarded the Theatre World Award, the Lucille Lortel Award for Outstanding Featured Actress, and the Tony Award for Best Featured Actress in a Musical for Caroline, or Change. In 2010 she starred in Tyler Perry's For Colored Girls with Phylicia Rashad and Janet Jackson. In 2014, Rose returned to Broadway in a revival of A Raisin in the Sun, receiving a nomination for the Tony Award for Best Featured Actress in a Play.

After her film debut, King of the Bingo Game, she played the role of Kaya in From Justin to Kelly in 2003 and performed in Temptation in 2004, followed by Surviving Christmas as a singer in the choir. In 2006, Rose starred in Dreamgirls as Lorrell Robinson with Beyoncé Knowles, Jennifer Hudson, Jamie Foxx, and Eddie Murphy. Rose appeared in the films Just Add Water and Razor.

Rose also starred alongside Jill Scott in The No. 1 Ladies Detective Agency directed by Anthony Minghella.

The Princess and the Frog
Rose is best known for her role in Disney's 2009 animated feature The Princess and the Frog as the voice of the lead character Tiana; the character is Disney's first African-American princess. Rose said at the time, "Not only is [Tiana] the first black princess, she's the first American princess. So, the scope and the significance is larger than people even realize." Rose added that she hoped her role in the film would help affirm young brown-skinned children by seeing someone who looks like them in a Disney film. The film being released in 2009, the same year that Barack Obama and Michelle Obama entered the White House was completely coincidental, according to the creators. But several commentators noted how the coincidence reinforced the positive portrayal of African-Americans.

Rose hosted a hometown screening of The Princess and the Frog for children from the Charter Oak Cultural Center, a non-profit multi-cultural arts center that provides free after-school programs in Hartford, Connecticut. Rose's performance in the film garnered one nomination for an NAACP Image Award and three nominations for the Black Reel Awards. She won the Black Reel Award for Best Outstanding Voice Performance.

Rose was named a Disney Legend on August 19, 2011. Rose said, "I always dreamed of being a voice in a Disney movie, but even in those dreams, I never once dreamed of being a princess... I feel like what an honor that this is and how the dream comes true, bigger and stronger than I had even imagined it."

Tiana's Bayou Adventure (2024)
In June 2020, Disney announced that they would be reworking their flume ride Splash Mountain in their U.S. theme parks with characters from The Princess and the Frog. Rose said, "It's thrilling. People are amped and ready. I think it's awesome, particularly now, to be reinvigorating her story." Disney has stated that the ride will take place after the events of the film, during Carnival season. Rose also added that she would love for Disney to create a Tiana's Palace Restaurant at the theme parks. "I've been looking forward to a Tiana's Palace for years... I have dreams of them partnering with [New Orleans'] Café du Monde on some real deal beignets, having some fantastic shrimp and grits and king cake during Mardi Gras season. And the occasional second line through the joint. Basically all the things I love!" In June 2022, Rose mentioned that she has been involved with discussions with Disney on what they want the ride to be like. In July 2022, Disney announced that the ride will be called Tiana's Bayou Adventure and will open in Disneyland and Magic Kingdom in late 2024. In September 2022, it was confirmed that Rose would reprise her role as Tiana for the ride. In January 2023, it was announced that Disneyland will convert its French Market Restaurant in the New Orleans Square area of the park into a Tiana's Palace restaurant.

2010s
In 2010, Rose played the role of Yasmine in the movie For Colored Girls. One critic described Rose's performance as "especially fierce". From 2010 to 2013, Rose had a guest-starring role in the legal TV drama The Good Wife. She played the role of Sara Tidwell in the A&E miniseries Bag of Bones in 2011, based on the Stephen King novel of the same name.

In 2012, she guest-starred in the "Gone Abie Gone" episode in season 24 of The Simpsons, voicing Abe Simpson's second wife, Rita LaFleur.

Rose played the adult Kizzy in two episodes of television's Roots, an adaptation of the novel by Alex Haley and remake of the 1977 miniseries. Critic Alan Sepinwall, in suggesting Emmy nominees to the Academy of Television Arts & Sciences, called her "one of the best parts of the outstanding Roots ensemble". She had a role in the Starz series Power and the leading role in the 2017 BET drama The Quad.

Bedtime Stories for the Littles
During the COVID-19 pandemic lockdown of 2020, Rose created a weekly series where she read bedtime stories to small children to help ease their fear during the lockdown. Rose said, "I love reading to kids, and I wanted to give our little people something soft and soothing in this very jarring moment in time. I thought a bedtime story would be the perfect way. I can give my voice to the ones who know it best, without anyone leaving home." She also said that she wanted to help children act silly, use their imaginations, and find a love of books that Rose said she had as a child. As one of the stories in the series, Rose chose the Princess and the Frog book "Tiana's Growing Experiment."

2020s
In 2020, Rose starred in the Netflix musical Jingle Jangle: A Christmas Journey playing Jessica Jangle. Noni Rose applauded the film's portrayal of black and brown professionals in an English Victorian setting.

In 2021, she played an affluent, unhappy lawyer who employs a young mother fleeing an abusive relationship in the Netflix limited series Maid''.

Personal life 
Rose married actor Jason Dirden in October 2022. The wedding, which was officiated by Colman Domingo, took place at the Paramour Estate in Los Angeles. The couple kept their nuptials a secret before announcing they were married in Brides magazine on January 16, 2023.

Filmography

Film

Television

Web

Video games

Stage

Awards and nominations

Notes

References

External links

Anika Noni Rose at the Disney Legends Website

1972 births
African-American actresses
American sopranos
American Conservatory Theater alumni
Florida A&M University alumni
Living people
Obie Award recipients
People from Bloomfield, Connecticut
Tony Award winners
20th-century American actresses
21st-century American actresses
American musical theatre actresses
American voice actresses
Audiobook narrators
Theatre World Award winners
20th-century African-American women singers
21st-century African-American women singers